Euryopis flavomaculata is a tangle-web spider species with Palearctic distribution. It is notably found in Lithuania.

It is the type species of the genus Euryopis. The type locality is Regensburg, Germany.

See also 
 List of Theridiidae species

References 

Theridiidae
Spiders of Europe
Palearctic spiders
Spiders described in 1836